Acrobasis rubrifasciella, the alder tubemaker moth, is a species of snout moth in the genus Acrobasis. It was described by Alpheus Spring Packard in 1874, and is known from central-eastern Canada and eastern United States.

The larvae feed on Alnus species, including Alnus serrulata and Alnus rugosa. Young larvae feed on wintered leaf-buds of their host plant. Later, it constructs a silken tube with, from which shelter it feeds. Pupation takes place in a pupal chamber which is constructed at the end of the tube. Up to nine larvae may occur in a single nest, but each in its own tube.

References

Moths described in 1874
Acrobasis
Moths of North America